Centrax, also known as Centrax Limited is an engineering company based in Newton Abbot, Devon in the power generation industry making generating sets with Siemens gas turbine engines. These are known as industrial gas turbines.

History
Centrax was founded in 1946 by Richard HH Barr OBE, the chairman, Geoffrey R White, the technical director, who had worked with Sir Frank Whittle in the early stages of jet engines at Power Jets and Joseph Salim Peress.

In 1955 Centrax opened its compressor and turbine blade factory in Devon and became Centrax Ltd. In 1964 it entered into a joint arrangement with Misco Precision Casting (the Michigan-based  Misco division of Howmet Castings of Ohio) of the US and formed Central-Misco Ltd, a division of the company that made metal products with investment casting. It operated separate to the main company.
Centrax has two main operating Divisions: Centrax Limited and Centrax Turbine Components Limited.
The Gas Turbine Division designed, built and packages its own small gas turbine for industrial uses and since 1979, Centrax has been packaging the Rolls-Royce 501 aeroderivative gas turbine engine. In 2007 signed an exclusive deal with Rolls-Royce to package the 64 MW Rolls-Royce Trent 60 engine in a generating set in Europe-wide industrial projects. It opened a new factory on its site to build the Trent 60 sets.
In 2011 Centrax Limited signed an agreement with Siemens to package the Siemens 300 and 400 industrial gas turbine for markets in UK, France, Italy, The Netherlands and Belgium.

Awards
In 2010 and 2002 it won a Queen's Award for Enterprise, and in 1969 a Queen's Award to Industry for export achievement.

Structure
Centrax has two divisions:

Gas Turbine Division
Centrax Limited packages the Rolls-Royce 501 range of industrial gas turbines (Now part of the Siemens portfolio and brought to market as the Siemens SGT-A05 AE since 2017) which range from 3.9 to 5.2 Megawatts as well as the Rolls-Royce Trent 60 gas turbine (64 Megawatts). Since 2011 Centrax has been packaging the Siemens 300 and 400 industrial gas turbines for 5 countries in Europe. This has since been expanded to all EU countries + Turkey.  The main market for the division is the combined heat and power market in Europe including Eastern Europe and previously Russia.

Turbine Components
Centrax manufactures precision components for jet engines, namely compressor and turbine aerofoils (blades), discs, shafts and casings.

Worldwide
Centrax Ltd. has service depots in:
 Zoeterwoude, Netherlands
 Gießen (Wieseck), Germany
 Warsaw, Poland
 Montale Rangone, Italy
 Ormes, Loiret, France
 Oeiras Municipality, Portugal
 Castellón, Spain

Market
Centrax sells turbine blade components to civil and military aircraft companies and operators around the world. Centrax industrial gas turbine generating sets are sold for power generation and combined heat and power systems - usually large manufacturing plants that require large amounts of heating or steam. It exports 95% of its turnover.

Products
Throughout its history, Centrax's generating sets ranged from 3.9MW to 64MW and are based on the Rolls-Royce 501 (c.5MW) and Trent 60 engines. Centrax turbine components include much of a complete jet engine except to combustion equipment.

Since the signing of an exclusive packager agreement with Siemens in 2011 Centrax offers the following options of generating sets:
 CX501 KB5 - 3.9MW
 CX501 KB7 - 5.3MW
 CX300 - 7.9MW
 CX300 - 8.5MW
 CX400 - 10.4MW
 CX400 - 12.9MW
 CX400 - 14.4MW

In the past they did offer the generating sets listed below, however they are no longer apart of the product range: 
 CX211 - 33MW 
 Trent 60WLE - 60.5MW 
 Trent 60WLE ISI - 64MW

See also
 Components of jet engines

References

External links
 Centrax website

Electrical generation engine manufacturers
Engineering companies of England
Newton Abbot
Companies based in Devon
British companies established in 1946
Electronics companies established in 1946
Manufacturing companies established in 1946
1946 establishments in England
Engine manufacturers of the United Kingdom